Nashik Metropolitan Region Development Authority (NMRDA) is the Planning and Development Authority for the Nashik Metropolitan Region. It was notified in the year 2018 , making an urban unit in Maharashtra.
NMRDA covers, Nashik city,entire Talukas of Nashik, Niphad, Sinnar, Dindori, Igatpuri, and Trimbakeshwar. NMRDA has been set up as a legally empowered and a self-financing corporate body by the Urban Development Department of the Government of Maharashtra.

See also 
Nashik Metropolitan Region
Pune Metropolitan Region
Mumbai Metropolitan Region Development Authority
Nagpur Metropolitan Region Development Authority

References 

State urban development authorities of India
State agencies of Maharashtra
2018 establishments in Maharashtra